Faqer Khadariyan (also Romanized as Faqīr Khadarīyān; also known as Faqīyeh Khadarīyān and Faqīr Khadar) is a village in Baryaji Rural District, in the Central District of Sardasht County, West Azerbaijan Province, Iran. At the 2006 census, its population was 42, in 9 families.

References 

Populated places in Sardasht County